Affirm Films is an American Christian film studio and label of Sony Pictures Worldwide Acquisitions,  which produces, markets, and acquires faith-based films. The studio's highest-grossing faith-based dramas are Heaven is for Real, Miracles from Heaven, and War Room. Its films having collectively grossed over $520 million in worldwide box office receipts, and its total overall revenue surpassing $2 billion over the last 14 years, and with less than one film produced and released per year during that time, it is the most successful Christian film studio of all time.

Filmography
Following is a list of films produced and distributed by Affirm Films.

Pure Flix
Affirm has an Internet video on demand service simply named Pure Flix (stylized as PURE FLIX), which was acquired from the studio of the same name (now Pinnacle Peak Pictures) in 2020. The company was founded by David A. R. White, replacing the streaming platform "I Am Flix". It specializes in Christian streaming media and video-on-demand online.

See also
Gener8Xion Entertainment
Pinnacle Peak Pictures
Provident Films
Kingdom Studios
Five & Two Pictures
Fox Faith
Kendrick Brothers
Lightworkers Media
Miracle Channel
 Reverence Gospel Media
Sherwood Pictures

References

External links
 

Christian film production companies
Mass media companies established in 2007
Sony Pictures Entertainment
Film production companies of the United States
Companies based in Culver City, California